The Bahama Banks are the submerged carbonate platforms that make up much of the Bahama Archipelago.  The term is usually applied in referring to either the Great Bahama Bank around Andros Island, or the Little Bahama Bank of Grand Bahama Island and Great Abaco, which are the largest of the platforms, and the Cay Sal Bank north of Cuba. The islands of these banks are politically part of the Bahamas. Other banks are the three banks of the Turks and Caicos Islands, namely the Caicos Bank of the Caicos Islands, the bank of the Turks Islands, and wholly submerged Mouchoir Bank. Farther southeast are the equally wholly submerged Silver Bank and Navidad Bank north of the Dominican Republic.

Geologic history and structure
The limestone that comprises the Banks has been accumulating since at least the Cretaceous period, and perhaps as early as the Jurassic; today the total thickness under the Great Bahama Bank is over 4.5 kilometres (2.8 miles).  As the limestone was deposited in shallow water, the only way to explain this massive column is to estimate that the entire platform has subsided under its own weight at a rate of roughly 3.6 centimetres (2 inches) per 1,000 years.

The waters of the Bahama Banks are very shallow; on the Great Bahama Bank they are generally no deeper than 25 meters (80 feet).
The slopes around them however, such as the border of the Tongue of the Ocean in the Great Bahama Bank, are very steep.  The Banks were dry land during past ice ages, when sea level was as much as 120 meters (390 feet) lower than at present; the area of the Bahamas today thus represents only a small fraction of their prehistoric extent.  When they were exposed to the atmosphere, the limestone structure was subjected to chemical weathering that created the caves and sinkholes common to karst terrain, resulting in structures like blue holes.

See also

Oolitic Aragonite Sand - largest deposit of oolitic aragonite sand is found on the Bahamas Banks

References

Further reading

External links
European Space Agency: Earth From Space: The Great Bahamas Bank, on http://spaceref.com, December 20, 2014 11:00 AM

Undersea banks of the Atlantic Ocean
Landforms of the Bahamas
Landforms of the Caribbean
Cretaceous Caribbean
Jurassic Caribbean
Early Cretaceous North America
Late Jurassic North America